Kuwait is a country in Western Asia. Situated in the northern edge of Eastern Arabia at the tip of the Persian Gulf, it shares borders with Iraq and Saudi Arabia. , Kuwait has a population of 4.2 million people; 1.3 million are Kuwaitis and 2.9 million are expatriates. Oil reserves were discovered in 1938. From 1946 to 1982, the country underwent large-scale modernization. In the 1980s, Kuwait experienced a period of geopolitical instability and an economic crisis following the stock market crash. In 1990, Kuwait was invaded by Iraq. The Iraqi occupation came to an end in 1991 after military intervention by coalition forces. At the end of the war, there were extensive efforts to revive the economy and rebuild national infrastructure.

Notable firms
This list includes notable companies with primary headquarters located in the country. The industry and sector follow the Industry Classification Benchmark taxonomy. Organizations which have ceased operations are included and noted as defunct.

See also 
 List of airlines of Kuwait

References 

Kuwait